Burks v. United States, 437 U.S. 1 (1978), is a United States Supreme Court decision that clarified both the scope of the protection against double jeopardy provided by the Fifth Amendment to the United States Constitution and the limits of an appellate court's discretion to fashion a remedy under section 2106 of Title 28 to the United States Code. It established the constitutional rule that where an appellate court reverses a criminal conviction on the ground that the prosecution failed to present sufficient evidence to prove the defendant's guilt beyond a reasonable doubt, the Double Jeopardy Clause shields the defendant from a second prosecution for the same offense. Notwithstanding the power that appellate courts have under section 2106 to "remand the cause and direct the entry of such appropriate judgment, decree, or order, or require such further proceedings to be had as may be just under the circumstances," a court that reverses a conviction for insufficiency of the evidence may not allow the lower court a choice on remand between acquitting the defendant and ordering a new trial. The "only 'just' remedy" in this situation, the Court held, is to order an acquittal.

Facts and Procedural History 
David Wayne Burks, the petitioner in this case, pled not guilty "by reason of insanity" to a charge of armed bank robbery under 18 U.S.C. § 2113(d).

To support this insanity defense at his jury trial in the Middle District of Tennessee, Burks called as expert witnesses two psychiatrists and a psychologist. Although they diagnosed him differently, they all testified that the defendant "suffered from a mental illness at the time of the robbery, which rendered him substantially incapable of conforming his conduct to the requirements of the law."

To rebut Burks' evidence of insanity, the federal prosecutor called two expert witnesses and lay witnesses. One of the expert witnesses opined that Burks had a "character disorder," but was not mentally ill. Although the other expert agreed that a character disorder afflicted Burks, he "gave a rather ambiguous answer to the question of whether Burks had been capable of conforming his conduct to the law." The Government's lay witnesses, including police officers and a cab driver whose taxi was taken at gun point by Burks,  testified that Burks "seemed sane" at the time. Another lay witness, Burks' work supervisor, testified that Burks had once told him "a bizarre story of a room with cameras all around '. . . and blowing somebody's brains out and having a picture of it.'"

After each side presented its case, the defendant moved the court for a judgment of acquittal, arguing that the Government's evidence was insufficient to prove his guilt. The district court denied the motion and submitted the case to the jury, which found the defendant guilty. He received a twenty-year sentence. At that point, Burks moved for a new trial, renewing his insufficiency-of-the-evidence argument. Again, the district court denied his motion.

Burks appealed to the United States Court of Appeals for the Sixth Circuit seeking a reversal of his conviction. He conceded that he had held up the bank, but maintained that he was insane when he did so and that the Government had failed to prove otherwise. The Sixth Circuit agreed that the Government's evidence was insufficient to prove Burks' sanity (and, accordingly, his criminal responsibility) beyond a reasonable doubt. Having made this threshold determination, the Sixth Circuit reasoned that "[s]ince Burks made a motion for a new trial," it had "discretion in determining the course to direct on remand" under 28 U.S.C. § 2106. It, then, instructed the district court to choose between two alternatives on remand: either entering a directed verdict of acquittal or ordering a new trial.

To guide the lower court in this decision, the Sixth Circuit advised it to consider whether the Government could present additional evidence sufficient to justify a new trial, but also gave the court discretion to acquit the defendant if the equities—or fairness—demanded that result:

Both the Government and the defendant filed petitions for rehearing in the Sixth Circuit, which were denied. The Supreme Court granted Burks' petition for a writ of certiorari, taking jurisdiction of the case under 28 U.S.C. § 1254(1).

Relevant Constitutional Provision 
The Double Jeopardy Clause of the Fifth Amendment to the United States Constitution provides: "No person shall be . . . subject for the same offence to be twice put in jeopardy of life or limb . . . ."

Among other things, "[t]he Double Jeopardy Clause forbids a second trial for the purpose of affording the prosecution another opportunity to supply evidence which it failed to muster in the first proceeding." The Clause does so to "protect an individual from being subjected to the hazards of trial and possible conviction more than once for an alleged offense." An acquittal triggers this protection. As the Court recently explained: '[T]he law attaches particular significance to an acquittal,' United States v. Scott, so a merits-related ruling concludes proceedings absolutely. This is because '[t]o permit a second trial after an acquittal, however mistaken the acquittal may have been, would present an unacceptably high risk that the Government, with its vastly superior resources, might wear down the defendant so that ‘even though innocent he may be found guilty,’. And retrial following an acquittal would upset a defendant's expectation of repose, for it would subject him to additional 'embarrassment, expense and ordeal' while 'compelling him to live in a continuing state of anxiety and insecurity.'"

Court Decision

Question Presented 
In Burks, the Court answered the question "whether a defendant may be tried a second time when a reviewing court has determined that in a prior trial the evidence was insufficient to sustain the verdict of the jury."

The Short Answer 
A defendant, like Burks, may not be tried a second time when an appellate court reverses his conviction because the evidence at trial was insufficient to support a guilty verdict against the defendant. That court must order an acquittal. But a retrial is permissible where the reviewing court reverses a conviction for trial error.

The Long Answer

Petitioner's Argument 
Beginning with the settled proposition that a second trial would violate the Double Jeopardy Clause if the trial court found that the prosecution's evidence was insufficient to sustain the jury's guilty verdict, Burks contended that the same constitutional protection should apply when the reviewing court is the court to make that determination. The Supreme Court ultimately agreed with Burks, but it had to address and overrule contrary precedent to do so.

Precedent 
"The Court's holdings in this area. . . . can hardly be characterized as models of consistency and clarity."—Burks v. United States, 437 U.S. 1, 9 (1978) (Burger, C.J.). In 1950, the Supreme Court rejected an argument, essentially the same as Burks', in Bryan v. United States. There, the Court held that the Double Jeopardy Clause posed no bar to retrying a defendant, who, like Burks, had unsuccessfully moved the trial court for a judgment of acquittal and, alternatively, a new trial, but whose conviction was reversed for insufficiency of the evidence by an appellate court.

But five years later, in Sapir v. United States, the Supreme Court issued a single-paragraph per curiam opinion, vacating a Court of Appeals' order that directed a new trial under similar factual circumstances as in Bryan. The Court did not explain itself. But Justice Douglas wrote a concurring opinion, in which he distinguished Sapir from Bryan on the ground that Bryan had asked for a new trial and, therefore, had "open[ed] the whole record for such disposition as might be just."

Then, in Yates v. United States, the Court invoked its power under 28 U.S.C. § 2106 to order new trials for some defendants and acquittals for others. "[U]nder that statute," the Court reasoned, there was "no doubt" that it was "justified in refusing to order acquittal even where the evidence might be deemed palpably insufficient, particularly since petitioners have asked in the alternative for a new trial as well as for acquittal."

Finally, the Court had held in Forman v. United States that a new trial following a reversal—no matter the ground—never constitutes double jeopardy: "It is elementary in our law that a person can be tried a second time for an offense when his prior conviction for that same offense has been set aside by his appeal."

In Burks, the Court read the "Bryan-Forman line of decisions" to mean that "[a] defendant who requests a new trial as one avenue of relief may be required to stand trial again, even when his conviction was reversed due to failure of proof at the first trial."

Departing from Precedent  
The Court acknowledged that because Burks had appealed from the district court's denial of his motion for new trial, the Bryan-Forman line, if it were followed, allowed a new trial upon reversal. But the Court departed from that line, holding "it should make no difference that the reviewing court, rather than the trial court determined the evidence to be insufficient"—Double Jeopardy bars retrial in both cases.

Reasoning 
The Court provided the following justifications for its rule and its rejection of precedent as well as of the Sixth Circuit's equitable remedy:

 compliance with the what the "Double Jeopardy Clause commands," because "where the Double Jeopardy Clause is applicable, its sweep is absolute," such that "[t]here are no 'equities' to be balanced," and the "constitutional policy" that the Clause declares is "not open to judicial examination";
 Bryan's reliance on an 1896 case, United States v. Ball, was misplaced because that case established merely that retrial after reversal for trial error does not violate the Double Jeopardy Clause;
 avoidance of the "purely arbitrary distinction between those in petitioner's position and others who would enjoy the benefit of a correct decision by the [trial] court."

The Court also explained why the Double Jeopardy Clause permits a second prosecution following reversal for trial error—such as flawed jury instructions, evidentiary rulings, or prosecutorial misconduct—but not for evidentiary insufficiency. Because trial errors "impl[y] nothing with respect to the guilt or innocence of the defendant," the Court reasoned, "[i]t would be a high price indeed for society to pay were every accused granted immunity from punishment because of any defect sufficient to constitute reversible error in the proceedings leading to conviction." Where trial error occurs, a defendant "has a strong interest in obtaining a fair readjudication of his guilt free from error, just as society maintains a valid concern for insuring that the guilty are punished." The same cannot be said after a reversal for insufficiency of the evidence, where the prosecution has already had "one fair opportunity to offer whatever proof it could assemble." What is more, the Court observed, it is no small matter for a reviewing court to reverse a conviction on these grounds, as it "must sustain the verdict if there is substantial evidence, viewed in the light most favorable to the Government, to uphold the jury's decision." The "prosecution's failure [will be] clear" in cases where a reviewing court holds otherwise.

The Court rejected the argument that a defendant, by asking for a new trial, waives his right against double jeopardy. It also disagreed with the Sixth Circuit and Yates that 28 U.S.C. § 2106 authorizes a reviewing court to order retrial in these circumstances. Because the Double Jeopardy Clause forbids retrial once such a court has ruled in favor of the defendant on the sufficiency issue, the only "just" remedy within the meaning of section 2106 is to order the lower court to acquit.

Open Question Answered 
Soon after Burks came down, a case note about the decision observed that the Court's rule was ambiguous with respect to cases "where a trial error has affected the sufficiency of the evidence": One example of a trial error having an effect on the sufficiency of the evidence is the situation where the trial court has erroneously excluded evidence for the prosecution without which the rest of the evidence is legally insufficient to support the conviction. Another example is where the trial court has erroneously admitted evidence for the prosecution and on appeal it is determined first, that the evidence should not have been received by the trial court, and second, that without such evidence the prosecution's case is palpably insufficient and will not support the conviction. Although these issues were not addressed directly in Burks, the Court intimated that such infirmities are to be treated as trial errors. In Lockhart v. Nelson, the Court answered this question. In an opinion by Chief Justice Rehnquist, it held that retrial is constitutionally permissible if a reviewing court sets aside a conviction because the lower court erroneously accepted prosecution evidence—in Nelson, a prior conviction of which the defendant had been pardoned, a fact not discovered until after trial—without which, there was insufficient proof to sustain the conviction. Because a trial court considers all evidence admitted in deciding whether to grant a motion for acquittal, a reviewing court must do the same. Here, the sum of the evidence admitted at trial adequately supported the conviction. Justice Marshall, joined by Justice Brennan and Justice Blackmun, dissented, arguing, "If, in seeking to prove Nelson's four prior convictions, the State had offered documented evidence to prove three valid prior convictions and a blank piece of paper to prove a fourth, no one would doubt that [the government] had produced insufficient evidence and that the Double Jeopardy Clause barred retrial. There is no constitutionally significant difference between that hypothetical and this case." Lockhart nevertheless remains good law.

Recent Supreme Court Decisions Citing or Examining Burks  

 In Nelson v. Colorado, the Supreme Court held that due process prohibited Colorado from requiring individuals, whose convictions had been reversed or vacated, to prove their innocence before the state would reimburse them for costs, fees, and restitution payments ordered as part of their convictions. If a trial court set aside a guilty verdict for want of evidence, the state would have no claim to these individuals' property. Quoting Burks, the Court asserted "it should make no difference that the reviewing court, rather than the trial court determined the evidence to be insufficient."
 In Bravo-Fernandez v. United States, the Court cited Burks for the rule that "a court's evaluation of the evidence as insufficient to convict is equivalent to an acquittal and therefore bars a second prosecution for the same offense." This rule, it held, did not apply where the reviewing court vacated defendants' convictions because the lower court's jury instructions were legally erroneous. 
 In Evans v. Michigan, the Supreme Court decided that where the trial court had granted the defendant's motion for a directed verdict of acquittal on the ground that the prosecution failed to prove a fact that it mistakenly believed to be an element of the offense, the Double Jeopardy Clause prohibited retrying the defendant. The Court found support for its conclusion in Burks, reading that case for the rule that the prohibition against double jeopardy applies if the "'bottom-line' question of criminal culpability" has been resolved against the prosecution.

References

External links
 

1978 in United States case law
United States Supreme Court cases
United States Supreme Court cases of the Burger Court
United States Double Jeopardy Clause case law